is a Greek-style Shinto shrine on the island of Shōdoshima in the Inland Sea, Kagawa Prefecture, Japan. Constructed in 1973 and standing amidst a grove of olives - a thriving industry on the island - the shrine takes the form of a replica Greek temple, with stylobate, Doric columns, entablature with triglyphs, and bronze pedimental reliefs. There is an annual festival with Greek themes. The shrine is located within Setonaikai National Park.

See also
 Ancient Greek architecture
 Olive branch
 Kankakei

References

Shinto shrines in Kagawa Prefecture
Folly buildings
Greek Revival buildings
1970s in Japan
Religious buildings and structures completed in 1973
1973 establishments in Japan